Robert Kraft is an American songwriter, film composer, recording artist and record producer. As president of Fox Music from 1994 to 2012, he supervised the music for more than 300 Fox feature films, as well as dozens of TV shows. He co-produced the 2016 Score: A Film Music Documentary about film composers and the evolution of Hollywood film music.

Education
Kraft attended the Lawrenceville School, graduating in 1972, and graduated cum laude from Harvard University in 1976.

Recording and songwriting
Kraft has worked extensively in the recording industry, producing or co-producing such artists as Linda Ronstadt, Dr. John, Bette Midler, Celia Cruz, Tito Puente, Johnny Mathis, Bruce Willis, Jimmy Buffett, Don Henley, George Benson, Ozzy Osbourne, Southside Johnny, Albert Collins, Vonda Shepard, and Melissa Manchester. His songs have been recorded by The Manhattan Transfer, Bette Midler, Roberta Flack, Los Lobos, Diane Schuur, Bruce Willis, Joy Enriquez, Dr. John, and Kermit the Frog. As a solo artist and with his band, Robert Kraft and The Ivory Coast, he has released four albums on RCA, RSO, and Sonic Edge Records. In October 2013, Milan Records released “Consensual Sets”, a compilation of Kraft's greatest hits from 1979 to 1989. In November 2013, VIVID SOUNDS released a boxed set of Kraft's five original CDs, including "Robert Kraft Live at the Newport Jazz Festival, Town Hall NYC, 1980."

Film music
In 1989, Kraft co-produced the Academy Award-winning song, "Under The Sea", plus the Grammy Award-winning double-platinum soundtrack of The Little Mermaid, along with co-authors Howard Ashman and Alan Menken.  In 1992, Kraft was nominated for an Academy Award, a Grammy Award, and a Golden Globe Award for co-writing "Beautiful Maria of My Soul", the theme song from the Warner Bros. feature, The Mambo Kings. Kraft was also the film's composer and Executive Music Producer, producing the Gold soundtrack, which spent four weeks at Number One on Billboard's Latin Music chart. In 1999, Kraft was nominated for a second Golden Globe for co-writing the song, "How Can I Not Love You" for the 20th Century Fox film, Anna and the King, with songwriter Kenneth "Babyface" Edmonds and film composer George Fenton. Kraft also co-produced the long-charting soundtrack on Billboard's Jazz charts, Swing Kids.

As a writer, Kraft's other feature film credits include story co-author (with Bruce Willis) and score co-composer (with Michael Kamen) on the Tri-Star film, Hudson Hawk. He produced the Grammy-nominated soundtrack for the Jim Henson Productions' film, The Muppet Christmas Carol, and composed the score to the Warner Bros. feature, Seven Minutes in Heaven. Kraft was songwriter and musical producer on Adventures in Babysitting and Heartbreak Hotel. His television credits include co-writing theme songs for Who's The Boss? and Day by Day, as well as writing new themes for Wide World of Sports and songs for Fame.

Kraft composed the music for the ballet, "Thriller", choreographed by Matthew Diamond. (World Premier, Jacob's Pillow August 1981.) In 1992 Kraft founded the record label, Jim Henson Records, and as the vice president of music at Jim Henson Productions, inaugurated their music division.

Fox Filmed Entertainment
Kraft was the chief executive of Fox Music Inc. from 1994 until October 2012, supervising the scores and soundtracks for over 300 Fox Filmed Entertainment motion pictures. Highlights during his tenure at Fox include the record-breaking scores and soundtracks from Avatar, Titanic, Waiting to Exhale, Moulin Rouge!, Garden State, Romeo + Juliet, The Full Monty, Ice Age, Dr. Dolittle, Bulworth, Walk the Line, Alvin and the Chipmunks, Once, Juno., Slumdog Millionaire, Black Swan, Rio, and Life of Pi. Kraft's division, Fox Music, also supervised the music for Twentieth Century Fox Television hits such as "Ally McBeal" and "X-Files", as well as shows "24", "American Dad!", "Family Guy", and "The Simpsons". Since 1994, television soundtracks from Fox Music have included the worldwide platinum albums from "Ally McBeal" and "X-Files", plus hit compilations from "Buffy the Vampire Slayer", "Dark Angel", "The Simpsons", "Roswell" and "24".

Since Kraft became chief executive in 1994, Fox Music was responsible for the worldwide sales of over 60 million albums, producing 3 Platinum, 6 Multi-Platinum and 6 Gold records. Under his leadership, Fox Music garnered 10 Academy Award nominations, winning 4 Academy Awards, 20 Golden Globe nominations (including 5 Golden Globe Awards), 61 Emmy nominations with 11 wins, and 49 Grammy nominations including 14 Grammy Awards.

Other projects
In 1994, Kraft was elected to the National Academy of Recording Arts and Sciences' board of governors, Los Angeles Chapter. In 1995, Kraft became a member of the Music Branch of the Academy of Motion Picture Arts and Sciences. Kraft was honored with the City of Hope Spirit of Life Award in 2002, and with the T.J. Martell Foundation's Spirit of Excellence in the Arts Award in 2010. As co-chairman of the Grammy Host Committee for the 2001 Grammy Awards in Los Angeles, Kraft and co-chair Tim Leiweke raised money to support Grammy In The Schools. In addition, Kraft founded entermusic.org in 2001, a Music Mentoring organization affiliated with Hamilton High School in Los Angeles.

Kraft was elected to the board of directors of the Harvard Alumni Association in 2008, and was co-chair of the advisory committee of the Harvard Office for The Arts. He has lectured on film music at Harvard University, Stanford Graduate School of Business, Brown University, New York University, UCLA, University of Southern California, and Syracuse University. In 2005, he spoke on "Music and Images"  at MIDEM, the international music conference, and in 2009 and 2010 conducted film-music seminars at the Havana Film Festival in Havana, Cuba. 

Kraft is the Berklee College of Music Visiting Professor of Music and Media, (International campus-Valencia, Spain); He is also an executive board member of the World Soundtrack Academy, where he was awarded the World Soundtrack Academy Industry Award for 2012, and is on the board of the International Radio Festival, where he won the International Radio Festival Lifetime Achievement Award for 2012. In 2022, Kraft was elected to the  Academy of Motion Picture Arts and Sciences’ Music Branch Executive Committee.

Kraftbox Entertainment
In 2013, Kraft founded Kraftbox Entertainment, a Music and Media production, management, and consulting firm. 
Kraftbox is in production on projects across several platforms, including the feature film, “The Message (Rapper’s Delight)” with co-producers Paula Wagner and Stephanie Allain.  In partnership with Quincy Jones and Blumhouse TV, Kraft is also developing “Jazz Ambassadors”, the true story of a jazz band that toured the world during the Cold War. Kraftbox is also developing a docu-series about the life of Ray Charles, co-produced with Frank Marshall and director RJ Cutler.

The film, "SCORE! The Film Music Documentary", co-produced by Kraft, premiered at film festivals around the world in 2016, and, upon its 2017 release, entered the iTunes documentary chart at #1, where it stayed for 4 weeks. "SCORE: THE PODCAST", a weekly podcast with Kraft as co-host, has completed over 50 episodes featuring top film composers. 

In 2022, Kraft debuted a new, live series called "CUE THE MUSIC with ROBERT KRAFT” at The Broad Stage in Santa Monica, Ca., featuring evenings with world-class film composers in concert and conversation.

Other Kraftbox projects include When Albums Ruled the World, a documentary broadcast on BBC 4 (February 2013). In 2014, Kraft co-produced the hit Off-Broadway one-man show, "The Lion", starring Benjamin Scheuer. In 2015, Kraft signed singer, songwriter, and trumpeter Spencer Ludwig to Warner Bros. Records, and became Spencer's manager. Spencer's first WB Records single, "Diggy" (released July 2016) was the theme song for Target's Fall 2016 ad campaign.

References

External links

Berklee.edu

Year of birth missing (living people)
Place of birth missing (living people)
Living people
American film producers
American film score composers
American record producers
American male songwriters
Harvard University alumni
RSO Records artists
American male film score composers